A pulsar timing array (PTA) is a set of pulsars which is analysed to search for correlated signatures in the pulse arrival times. There are many applications for pulsar timing arrays. The best known is the use of an array of millisecond pulsars to detect and analyse gravitational waves. Such a detection would result from a detailed investigation of the correlation between arrival times of pulses emitted by the millisecond pulsars as a function of the pulsars' angular separations.

Overview
Millisecond pulsars are used because they are not prone to the starquakes and accretion events which can affect the period of classical pulsars.

One influence on these propagation properties are low-frequency gravitational waves, with a frequency of 10−9 to 10−6 hertz; the expected astrophysical sources of such gravitational waves are massive black hole binaries in the centres of merging galaxies, where tens of millions of solar masses are in orbit with a period between months and a few years.

The gravitational waves cause the time of arrival of the pulses to vary by a few tens of nanoseconds over their wavelength (so, for a frequency of 3 x 10 −8 Hz, one cycle per year, one would find that pulses arrive 20 ns early in July and 20 ns late in January). This is a delicate experiment, although millisecond pulsars are stable enough clocks that the time of arrival of the pulses can be predicted to the required accuracy; the experiments use collections of 20 to 50 pulsars to account for dispersion effects in the atmosphere and in the space between the observer and the pulsar. It is necessary to monitor each pulsar roughly once a week; a higher cadence of observation would allow the detection of higher-frequency gravitational waves, but it is unclear whether there would be loud enough astrophysical sources at such frequencies.

It is not possible to get accurate sky locations for the sources by this method, as analysing timings for twenty pulsars would produce a region of uncertainty of 100 square degreesa patch of sky about the size of the constellation Scutum which would contain at least thousands of merging galaxies.

The main goal of PTAs is measuring the amplitude of background gravitational waves caused by a history of supermassive black hole mergers. The amplitudes can describe the history of how galaxies were formed. The bound on the amplitude of the background waves is called an upper limit. The amplitude of the gravitational wave background is less than the upper limit.

Some supermassive black holes binaries may form a stable binary and only merge after many times the current age of the universe. This is called the final parsec problem. It is unclear how supermassive black holes approach each other at this distance.

While supermassive black hole binaries are the main source of very low frequency gravitational waves, other sources could generate the waves, such as cosmic strings, which may have formed early in the history of the universe. When cosmic strings interact, they can form loops that decay by radiating gravitational waves.

Active and proposed PTAs

Globally there are five active pulsar timing array projects. The first three projects (PPTA, EPTA, and NANOGrav) have begun collaborating under the title of the International Pulsar Timing Array project, China also became an active part, later InPTA also became an active part.
 The Parkes Pulsar Timing Array (PPTA) at the Parkes radio-telescope has been collecting data since March 2005.
 The European Pulsar Timing Array (EPTA) uses data from the four largest radio telescopes in Europe:
 Lovell Telescope 
 Westerbork Synthesis Radio Telescope
 Effelsberg Telescope 
 Nancay Radio Telescope. 
 Upon completion the Sardinia Radio Telescope will be added to the EPTA also. 
 The North American Nanohertz Observatory for Gravitational Waves (NANOGrav) uses data collected by the Arecibo and Green Bank radio telescopes.
 The Chinese Pulsar Timing Array uses the Five-hundred-meter Aperture Spherical radio Telescope(FAST).
 The Indian Pulsar Timing Array (InPTA) uses the upgraded Giant Metrewave Radio Telescope.

References

External links
Pulsar timing array simulator SimPTA
European Pulsar Timing Array
North American Nanohertz Gravitational Wave Observatory (NANOGrav)

Gravitational-wave astronomy